Masakatsu Ueda (born December 21, 1977) is a professional Japanese mixed martial artist who currently competes in the bantamweight division of Pancrase. 

Ueda was also a college level wrestler in Japan, where holds a win over fellow mixed martial artist and Japanese superstar Norifumi Yamamoto, better known as "Kid" Yamamoto. Ueda has also won many national titles in combat wrestling. He also won the All Japan Shooto Grappling championship, and both A and B class Shooto Rookie Tournaments. He is a blue belt in Brazilian Jiu-Jitsu under Yuki Nakai.

Mixed martial arts career

Shooto
Ueda won the vacant Shooto Featherweight Championship after defeating Koetsu Okazai on March 28, 2008, by Unanimous Decision at Shooto's Back To Our Roots 8 show.

Bellator
Ueda faced Travis Marx in the first round of the Season 6 Bantamweight Tournament and suffered a unanimous decision loss in a competitive fight. He was later released from the promotion.

ONE Fighting Championship
Following his release from Bellator, Ueda signed with ONE Championship and entered the ONE FC Bantamweight Grand Prix. He made his debut against Min Jung Song at ONE Fighting Championship: Rise of Kings on October 6.

Ueda faced Jens Pulver in the Bantamweight Grand Prix semifinals on April 5, 2013, at ONE Fighting Championship: Kings and Champions. He won the fight by submission.

On May 31, 2013, he faced Kevin Belingon at ONE Fighting Championship: Rise to Power in the ONE Bantamweight Grand Prix Final. Ueda won the fight by unanimous decision.  

By winning the Bantamweight Grand Prix, Ueda was able to secure a title shot against Bibiano Fernandes for the ONE Bantamweight Championship. He faced Fernandes at ONE Fighting Championship: Rise of Heroes on May 2, 2014. He lost by unanimous decision.

Championships and accomplishments
Shooto
Shooto Featherweight Championship (1 time)
Three successful title defenses
ONE Fighting Championship
ONE FC Bantamweight 2013 Grand Prix Champion

Mixed martial arts record

|-
|Loss
|align=center|26–6–2
|Rafael Silva
|Decision (unanimous)
|Pancrase 296
|
|align=center|5
|align=center|5:00
|Tokyo, Japan
|For Pancrase Interim Bantamweight Championship
|-
|Win
|align=center|26–5–2
|Alan Yoshihiro Yamaniha
|Submission (keylock)
|Pancrase 291
|
|align=center|3
|align=center|4:52
|Tokyo, Japan
|
|-
|Win
|align=center|25–5–2
|Toshinori Tsunemura
|Decision (unanimous)
|Pancrase 288
|
|align=center|3
|align=center|5:00
|Tokyo, Japan
|
|-
|Win
|align=center|24–5–2
|Victor Henry
|Decision (unanimous)
|Pancrase 285
|
|align=center|3
|align=center|5:00
|Tokyo, Japan
|
|-
|Win
|align=center|23–5–2
|Hidekazu Fukushima
|Decision (unanimous)
|Pancrase 282
|
|align=center|3
|align=center|5:00
|Tokyo, Japan
|
|-
|Loss
|align=center|22–5–2
|Rafael Silva
|Decision (unanimous)
|Pancrase 279
|
|align=center|3
|align=center|5:00
|Tokyo, Japan
|
|-
| Win
| align=center| 22–4–2
| Jun Doi
| Decision (unanimous)
| Grandslam 4: Way of the Cage
| 
| align=center| 3
| align=center| 3:00
| Tokyo, Japan
|
|-
| Win
| align=center| 21–4–2
| Jose Alday
| Technical Submission (rear naked choke)
| Pancrase - 275
| 
| align=center| 3
| align=center| 2:02
| Tokyo, Japan
|
|-
| Win
| align=center| 20–4–2
| Kosuke Terashima
| Decision (unanimous)
| Pancrase - 271
| 
| align=center| 3
| align=center| 3:00
| Tokyo, Japan
|
|-
| Win
| align=center| 19–4–2
| Luis Nogueira
| Decision (unanimous)
| Pancrase - 268
| 
| align=center| 3
| align=center| 5:00
| Tokyo, Japan
|
|-
| Loss
| align=center| 18–4–2
| Victor Henry
| Submission (kneebar)
| Grandslam MMA 2: Way of the Cage
| 
| align=center| 3
| align=center| 3:22
| Tokyo, Japan
|
|-
| Loss
| align=center| 18–3–2
| Bibiano Fernandes
| Decision (unanimous)
| ONE FC: Rise of Heroes
| 
| align=center| 5
| align=center| 5:00
| Pasay, Philippines
| <small>For the ONE FC Bantamweight Championship
|-
| Win
| align=center| 18–2–2
| Kevin Belingon
|  Decision (unanimous)
| ONE FC: Rise to Power
| 
| align=center| 3
| align=center| 5:00
| Pasay, Philippines
| <small>Won the ONE FC Bantamweight Grand Prix.
|-
| Win
| align=center| 17–2–2
| Jens Pulver
| Submission (D'arce choke)
| ONE FC: Kings and Champions
| 
| align=center| 2
| align=center| 3:52
| Kallang, Singapore
| <small>ONE FC Bantamweight Grand Prix semifinal
|-
| Win
| align=center| 16–2–2
| Min Jung Song
| Decision (unanimous)
| ONE FC: Rise of Kings
| 
| align=center| 3
| align=center| 5:00
| Kallang, Singapore
| <small>ONE FC Bantamweight Grand Prix first round
|-
|  Loss
| align=center| 15–2–2
| Travis Marx
| Decision (unanimous) 
| Bellator 64
| 
| align=center| 3
| align=center| 5:00
| Windsor, Ontario, Canada
| <small>Bellator Season 6 Bantamweight Tournament Quarterfinal
|-
|  Win
| align=center| 15–1–2
| Kyoji Horiguchi
| Decision (majority)
| Shooto: Survivor Tournament Final
| 
| align=center| 3
| align=center| 5:00
| Tokyo, Japan
| <small>Return to Bantamweight
|-
|  Win
| align=center| 14–1–2
| Royler Gracie
| Decision (split)
| Amazon Forest Combat 1
| 
| align=center| 3
| align=center| 5:00
| Manaus, Brazil
| <small>Lightweight bout
|-
|  Win
| align=center| 13–1–2
| Rumina Sato
| KO (kick to the body)		
| Shooto: Shooting Disco 15: Try Hard, Japan!
| 
| align=center| 1
| align=center| 4:23
| Tokyo, Japan
| 
|-
|  Win
| align=center| 12–1–2
| Ralph Acosta
| Submission (D'arce choke) 
| Shooto: Shootor's Legacy 1
| 
| align=center| 2
| align=center| 1:13
| Tokyo, Japan
| 
|-
|  Win
| align=center| 11–1–2
| Akitoshi Tamura
| Decision (unanimous) 
| Shooto: The Way of Shooto 3: Like a Tiger, Like a Dragon
| 
| align=center| 3
| align=center| 5:00
| Tokyo, Japan
| 
|-
|  Loss
| align=center| 10–1–2 
| Shuichiro Katsumura
| Submission (ninja choke)
| Shooto: The Way of Shooto 2: Like a Tiger, Like a Dragon
|  
| align=center| 2
| align=center| 3:39
| Tokyo, Japan
| Lost Shooto Featherweight (132 lbs.) Championship
|-
|  Win
| align=center| 10–0–2
| Eduardo Dantas
| Decision (unanimous) 
| Shooto: Revolutionary Exchanges 1: Undefeated
| 
| align=center| 3
| align=center| 5:00
| Tokyo, Japan
| Defended Shooto Featherweight (132 lbs.) Championship
|-
|  Win
| align=center| 9–0–2
| So Tazawa
| Decision (unanimous) 
| Shooto: Tradition 6
| 
| align=center| 3
| align=center| 5:00
| Tokyo, Japan
| Defended Shooto Featherweight (132 lbs.) Championship
|-
| Draw
| align=center| 8–0–2
| Marcos Galvão
| Draw (split) 
| Shooto: Shooto Tradition 3
| 
| align=center| 3
| align=center| 5:00
| Tokyo, Japan
| Defended Shooto Featherweight (132 lbs.) Championship
|-
|  Win
| align=center| 8–0–1
| Koetsu Okazaki
| Decision (unanimous) 
| Shooto: Back To Our Roots 8
|  
| align=center| 3
| align=center| 5:00
| Tokyo, Japan
| For the vacant Shooto Featherweight (132 lbs.) Championship
|-
|  Win
| align=center| 7–0–1
| Atsushi Yamamoto
| Decision (unanimous) 
| Shooto: Back To Our Roots 7
|  
| align=center| 3
| align=center| 5:00
| Tokyo, Japan
| 
|-
|  Win
| align=center| 6–0–1
| Tetsu Suzuki
| Decision (unanimous) 
| Shooto: Rookie Tournament 2007 Final
|  
| align=center| 3
| align=center| 5:00
| Tokyo, Japan
| 
|-
| Draw
| align=center| 5–0–1
| Takeya Mizugaki
| Draw (majority) 
| Shooto: Back To Our Roots 4
|  
| align=center| 3
| align=center| 5:00
| Tokyo, Japan
| 
|-
|  Win
| align=center| 5–0
| So Tazawa
| Submission (D'arce choke)
| Shooto: Back To Our Roots 2
|  
| align=center| 3
| align=center| 2:00
| Tokyo, Japan
| 
|-
|  Win
| align=center| 4–0
| Teriyuki Matsumoto
| Submission (triangle choke)
| Shooto: Rookie Tournament Final
|  
| align=center| 1
| align=center| 4:42
| Tokyo, Japan
| 
|-
|  Win
| align=center| 3–0
| Naoki Yahagi
| TKO (punches)
| Shooto 2006: 10/1 in Kitazawa Town Hall
|  
| align=center| 1
| align=center| 3:49
| Tokyo, Japan
| 
|-
|  Win
| align=center| 2–0
| Nobuhiro Hayakawa
| Decision (unanimous) 
| Shooto: Gig West 5
| 
| align=center| 2
| align=center| 5:00
| Osaka, Japan
| 
|-
|  Win
| align=center| 1–0
| Satoshi Yamashita
| Decision (unanimous) 
| Shooto 2005: 11/29 in Kitazawa Town Hall
|  
| align=center| 2
| align=center| 5:00
| Tokyo, Japan
|

References

External links 

https://web.archive.org/web/20090224202812/http://fourouncestofreedom.com/archives/fighter_az_masakatsu_ueda.phtml

Japanese male mixed martial artists
Bantamweight mixed martial artists
Mixed martial artists utilizing wrestling
Mixed martial artists utilizing Brazilian jiu-jitsu
Japanese practitioners of Brazilian jiu-jitsu
Japanese male sport wrestlers
1977 births
Living people